Simon-Jérôme Bourlet, abbé de Vauxcelles (11 August 1733, Versailles – 18 March 1802, Paris) was an 18th-century French priest and journalist during the French Revolution.

Biography 
Born in Versailles, he was a preacher of the king, canon of Noyon, reader for the Comte d'Artois, curator of the bibliothèque de l'Arsenal (1787), abbot of Massay. 

He preached successfully and worked, among others, at the Mercure de France, and the Journal de Paris. Like others, he was a victim of the repressive policies of the French Directory against journalists, and a decree dated 17 January (28 Nivose)  ordered his deportation to Oléron. 

We have some eulogies and some funeral orations by him, but he is best known for his edition of the Lettres de Mme de Sévigné, Paris, 1801, 10 volumes in-12°.

He participated in the proofreading relatively to the grammar and typography of the fifth edition of the Dictionnaire de l'Académie Française (1798).

A resident member of the Société des observateurs de l'homme, de Vauxelles also translated Dialogues on Medals (De l'allégorie, ou Traités sur cette matière) by Joseph Addison.

Works 
 Oraison funèbre de Louis XV [...] - A Paris : chez Saugrain, 1774 [Bibliothèque de la SHAS, Senlis]

External links 
 Simon-Jérôme Bourlet de Vauxcelles on data.bnf.fr
 Simon BOURLET DE VAUXCELLES (1733-1802) on Dictionnaire des journalistes
 Bust portrait of Bourlet de Vauxcelles on Artnet.com 

1733 births
People from Versailles
1802 deaths
18th-century French journalists
French librarians